David Douglas (born 1953) is a Canadian cinematographer, director and writer associated with many IMAX films including Fires of Kuwait, an Academy Award-nominated documentary film.  

Douglas was recipient of the Kodak Vision Award in 2002.

References

External links
 

Canadian documentary film directors
Living people
Place of birth missing (living people)
1953 births